Minganie—Le Golfe-du-Saint-Laurent is a census division of Quebec, with geographical code 98.  It consists of the regional county municipalities of Minganie and Le Golfe-du-Saint-Laurent.

It was formerly known as Minganie—Basse-Côte-Nord, but changed its name in 2010 when Basse-Côte-Nord, which was a territory equivalent to a regional county municipality (TE), was replaced by the new Le Golfe-du-Saint-Laurent Regional County Municipality. The division had a population of 11,708 in the Canada 2011 Census. Basse-Côte-Nord itself was part of Minganie until 2002.

Geographic hierarchy

In the second column:
 M = belongs to Minganie RCM juridically
 m = belongs to Minganie RCM geographically
 G = belongs to Le Golfe-du-Saint-Laurent RCM juridically
 g = belongs to Le Golfe-du-Saint-Laurent RCM geographically

References

Census divisions of Quebec